The 1963 football season was São Paulo's 34th season since club's existence.

Statistics

Overall
{|class="wikitable"
|-
|Games played || 57 (9 Torneio Rio-São Paulo, 30 Campeonato Paulista, 18 Friendly match)
|-
|Games won || 37 (3 Torneio Rio-São Paulo, 18 Campeonato Paulista, 16 Friendly match)
|-
|Games drawn || 11  (2 Torneio Rio-São Paulo, 8 Campeonato Paulista, 1 Friendly match)
|-
|Games lost || 9 (4 Torneio Rio-São Paulo, 4 Campeonato Paulista, 1 Friendly match)
|-
|Goals scored || 118
|-
|Goals conceded || 63
|-
|Goal difference || +55
|-
|Best result || 7–2 (A) v Nacional - Friendly match - 1963.04.28
|-
|Worst result || 2–6 (A) v Santos - Torneio Rio-São Paulo - 1963.03.07
|-
|Most appearances || 
|-
|Top scorer || 
|-|}

Friendlies

Pequeña Copa del Mundo de Clubes 1963

Official competitions

Torneio-Rio São Paulo

Record

Campeonato Paulista

Record

External links
official website 

Association football clubs 1963 season
1963
1963 in Brazilian football